Sahidur Rahman is a Jatiya Party (Ershad) politician and the former Member of Parliament of Brahmanbaria-6.

Career
Rahman was elected to parliament from Brahmanbaria-6 as an Independent candidate in 1986.

References

Jatiya Party politicians
Living people
3rd Jatiya Sangsad members
4th Jatiya Sangsad members
Year of birth missing (living people)